Dicranodonta is an extinct genus of bivalves from the Jurassic and Cretaceous.

References 

Prehistoric bivalve genera
Cucullaeidae